This is a list of songs described as feminist anthems, celebrating women's empowerment, or used as protest songs against gender inequality. These songs range from airy pop affirmations such as "Girls Just Want to Have Fun" by Cyndi Lauper, to solemn calls to action such as "We Shall Go Forth" by Margie Adam.

Songs have been used for many years to bring people together to work for women's rights. In the United States, the 1884 song "The Equal-Rights Banner" was sung to the tune of the US national anthem by American activists for women's voting rights. "The March of the Women" and "The Women's Marseillaise" were sung by British suffragettes as anthems of the women's suffrage movement in the 1900s–1910s.

The most prominent anthem of second-wave feminism is Helen Reddy's "I Am Woman", a pop song which appeared as an album track in 1971 without making a splash. It was released a second time in May 1972 after being altered and re-recorded. This improved version of the song slowly climbed the United States single charts, its airplay resisted by male deejays at radio stations, but urged forward by the demand of female listeners. The song finally hit number 1 in December 1972. "I Am Woman", with its uplifting message of female strength, was played and sung many times by women promoting the cause of feminism. In 2020, a documentary about the making of the song was released: I Am Woman, starring Tilda Cobham-Hervey as Reddy.

During the 1970s, earlier songs such as Aretha Franklin's "Respect" (1967) were brought forward as feminist anthems. Franklin's song, originally written by Otis Redding but significantly reworked by Franklin, serves multiple purposes including standing firm in personal relationships, advocating women's rights, and asserting racial equality for African Americans.

Before the women's liberation movement, popular songs sung by women often expressed subservience to men. Songs about independence from men were rare; many of these are now considered steps toward feminism. Examples include Sophie Tucker's self-explanatory "I Ain't Taking Orders From No One" (1920s), "No More" recorded in 1944 by Billie Holiday, and 1965's "Ain't No Use" by Nina Simone—the latter two about a woman leaving her man after suffering too many abuses. Shocking in its day, the 1963 song "You Don't Own Me" by Lesley Gore describes the singer standing up to her controlling boyfriend. In 2015, singer Saygrace took Gore's song to  1 in Australia with a version featuring rapper G-Eazy.

Women around the world have used songs to unite in feminism and to organize for women's rights. Mexican singer Vivir Quintana is known for her song "Canción sin miedo" (Song Without Fear) which in 2020 became an anthem to fight violence against women. In the Philippines, the 1981 song "Babae Ka" (You Are Woman) was covered by activist Susan Fernandez and also by the duo Inang Laya in the early 1980s as a protest against the reactionary patriarchal policies of dictator Ferdinand Marcos. In Chile starting in 2019, the song "Un violador en tu camino" (A Rapist in Your Path) by the collective Las Tesis has been performed by masses of women who sing and dance to protest police violence. This form of protest has spread to other countries.

Songs

See also
Girl power
Songs with feminist themes
Women's music

References

Feminist anthem
Feminism-related lists
Women in music